Craft's Field is a general aviation airport located southwest of Mason in Ingham County, Michigan, United States. The closest highway is US-127, which is approximately 3.5 miles east of the airport. The airport is accessible by road from Edgar Rd.

Facilities
Craft's Field has one runway designated 9/27 with a turf surface measuring 2,590 by 60 feet (789 x 18 m). The airport is closed December through March, and also when snow-covered.

References 

Airports in Michigan
Buildings and structures in Ingham County, Michigan
Defunct airports in Michigan
Transportation in Ingham County, Michigan